K-pop Selection was BoA's first Japanese compilation album. It was a collection of her Korean songs released in Japan (in the original Korean). It also had a "Perfect Edition" that came with several music videos.

Track listing

Normal edition
  No. 1                                                                                    3:12
  Milky Way                                                                               3:19
  Listen to My Heart                                                                      3:57
  Time To Begin                                                                           3:36
  ID; Peace B                                                                             3:58
  My Sweetie                                                                              3:37
  Day                                                                                     4:13
  Don't Start Now                                                                         3:43
  Atlantis Princess                                                                       3:44
  Realize (Stay With Me)                                                                  4:17
  Sara                                                                                    3:53
  Where Are You                                                                           3:47
 Come to Me                                                                              3:35
  Waiting                                                                                 4:17
  The Lights Of Seoul                                                                     4:26
 Amazing Kiss (Korean Ver.) 4:29
 Jewel Song (Korean Ver.) 5:22

Perfect edition
DVD included:

 No.1
 Atlantis Princess
 Milky Way

References

BoA albums
2004 compilation albums
Avex Group compilation albums